St Mary of the Angels Roman Catholic Church is located in Canton, Cardiff. It is part of the Roman Catholic Archdiocese of Cardiff. It opened on 3 November 1907.

The Parish Priest is Rev. Canon David Hayman.

Church history
The church was designed by architect Frederick Walters and built by W. T. Morgan. The foundation stone of the church was laid on 20 January 1907 by Bishop Hedley and later that year, on 30 October, the altar was consecrated before the church opened on 3 December. The tower was added in 1916. The church is built using roughly dressed Pennant sandstone and cut Bath stone ashlar dressings, in a late 12th-century French style.

In January 1941, the sacristies and St Ann's Chapel in the church were destroyed by an air raid to be rebuilt 10 years later.

In 1952, the church was temporarily closed to repaint and clean the church as well as to install new lighting and amplifiers. The church was repainted again in 1962.

It became a listed building in 1975, as a building of quality by a noted ecclesiastical architect.

Mgr. John Maguire, previous incumbent as Parish Priest, was appointed in 1991, after the church came under the care of the Archdiocese of Cardiff after many years under the Benedictine Community. Fr. Chris Delaney, O.S.B., a long-serving assistant priest returned to Buckfast Abbey in March 2011 after 44 years of faithful service in Canton. At the Chrism Mass on Wednesday 17 April 2019, Archbishop George Stack announced that Mgr. Maguire would retire from active ministry later in the year, having faithfully served numerous parishes in the Archdiocese of Cardiff since his ordination in 1967.

It was at the same time announced that Canon Peter Collins, previously the Dean of St. David's Metropolitan Cathedral, Cardiff, would succeed Mgr. Maguire as the current Parish Priest, with Fr. Nicholas Williams continuing as sole parochial vicar (assistant priest) following Fr. Andrea Bord's reassignment. These changes came into effect on the weekend of 31 August/1 September 2019. 

On 11th October 2022, it was announced that the parish priest, Canon Peter Collins, had been appointed by the Holy Father as the new Bishop of East Anglia, in succession to Bishop Alan Hopes. He was ordained bishop and installed as the fifth Bishop of East Anglia at St John the Baptist Cathedral in Norwich on 14th December 2022, the feast of Saint John of the Cross.

In January 2023, Archbishop Mark O'Toole appointed Rev. Canon David Hayman, the Chancellor of the Archdiocese of Cardiff, and parish priest of Pontypool, as the new parish priest.

The church underwent an internal reordering in 2000.

The parish has taken responsibility for the parish records of Sacred Heart, Leckwith, Cardiff.

Schools
The church is closely linked to its main Primary School, St Mary's R C Primary, Canton and Mary Immaculate Catholic High school, Wenvoe.

Higher Catholic Education in the area is provided by St David's Catholic College for ages 16 to 18, supported by the church.

In the news
The babies of Charlotte Church and Gavin Henson were baptised at St Mary of the Angels church. Ruby Henson was baptised on 28 June 2008 by Fr. Delaney OSB, who Church described as her favorite priest. Their son Dexter Lloyd Henson was christened in August 2009.

In Charlotte Church's Confessional Song, one line is "Poor old Father Delaney", referring to the St Mary's parish priest.

On Sunday 8 March 2020, at the outbreak of the COVID-19 crisis, St Mary of the Angels was featured on BBC Wales Today, discussing the initial infection-control measures taken at the time, including withdrawal of public access to the Chalice and use of Holy Water stoups. On 30 April, Wales Online published an article focusing on Hospital chaplaincy, also featuring the parish.

Church Groups
Altar Servers Guild of St. Stephen
St Mary's Music Group
Choir
Ministers of the Word
Extraordinary Ministers of Holy Communion
Parish Council
Parish Advisory Council
Children's Liturgy
Offertory group
Saint Vincent de Paul Society
Prayer Group

External links 
 Church Website 
 RCADC Church Webpage
 Parish YouTube channel

References

Grade II listed churches in Cardiff
Saint Mary
Roman Catholic churches in Cardiff
Frederick Walters buildings
Grade II listed Roman Catholic churches in Wales
Roman Catholic churches completed in 1907
20th-century Roman Catholic church buildings in the United Kingdom
1907 establishments in Wales
Romanesque Revival church buildings in the United Kingdom